Sedona Hotel is a high end hotel in Yangon, Myanmar. The hotel consists of two buildings named Garden Wing and Inya Wing. The 29-story Inya Wing tower was the tallest building in Myanmar from May to December of 2016.

Notes

References

Buildings and structures in Yangon
Hotels in Myanmar